Claire Daly is a baritone saxophonist and composer.

Early life
Daly was born in Bronxville, New York. She began playing the saxophone at the age of 12, becoming interested in jazz when she attended a Buddy Rich performance at the Westchester County Center. She attended Berklee College of Music, mainly playing alto and tenor saxophones, and graduated in 1980.

Later life and career
After graduating, Daly played alto and tenor saxophone in two rock bands while performing jazz in the Boston area. She moved to New York City in 1985 and began her career as a freelance baritone saxophonist. Beginning in the mid-1990s, she performed frequently with pianist Joel Forrester and together they released 6 CDs.

Daly's first album as a leader, Swing Low, was released in 1999.  It was later installed in the William Jefferson Clinton Library, Little Rock, Arkansas as a CD significant to the President while in office. 

As the original baritonist with the DIVA Jazz Orchestra she toured for seven years. In 2000 she performed at the Mary Lou Williams Women in Jazz Festival with her quartet. The next year she was guest soloist with the Billy Taylor Trio at the Kennedy Center. She released, Heaven Help Us All (on her own label, Daly Bread Records), in 2004, as bandleader.

Her 2008 self-released album Rah! Rah!, a tribute to Rahsaan Roland Kirk, was re-issued by Ride Symbol in 2020. In 2009, she began co-leading Two Sisters, Inc,, featuring baritone saxophonist Dave Sewelson and bassist Dave Hofstra, and recorded the album Scaribari. Her CD "Mary Joyce Project, Nothing to Lose" was dedicated to her second cousin who was the first non Alaskan to travel 1,000 miles, solo, by dogsled from Juneau to Fairbanks (1935). It premiered in Juneau at the "Jazz and Classics" Festival in May, 2011. In 2012, her album Baritone Monk, produced by Doug Moody. of the North Coast Brewing Co., hit number one on the CMJ Jazz Charts. Her 2016 CD, "2648 West Grand Boulevard," featured jazz versions of Motown tunes from the Detroit years. It is on the Glass Beach Jazz label, also produced by Doug Moody.

Daly is a three-time winner of the Jazz Journalists Association’s “Baritone Sax of the Year” Award and a multiple time winner of both the JazzTimes and Downbeat Critic and Readers Polls for “Baritone Saxophonist of the Year.”               

She has performed as a leader with her band at the Monterey, Healdsburg, Litchfield and Perth International jazz festivals, the Kennedy Center, Dizzy's Club at Lincoln Center and many more venues. She has written feature articles in jazz magazines as well as liner notes. She has backed up Aretha Franklin, James Brown, Joe Williams, Rosemary Clooney, Taj Mahal and Robert Palmer among others.

A veteran Litchfield Jazz Camp teaching artist (20 years), Daly was head of the Litchfield in NY combos, and a teacher at Jazz at Lincoln Center MSJA. She continues to offer clinics and teach privately and at jazz camps. She has taught at MIT, UMASS Amherst; Valparaiso University, IN; Hall High School in Hartford, CT; College of St. Rose in Albany, NY; Chamber Street Music School in Manhattan, NY; Hoff Barthelson Music School, Scarsdale, NY; Towson University; Syracuse University; and many more.

Playing and composing style
A DownBeat reviewer in 2011 wrote that Daly's "saxophone work and hard-bop-tinged, conversational compositions recall Dexter Gordon or Vince Guaraldi".  The Director of the MIT Festival Jazz Ensemble commented that "Claire Daly is a first-rate musician and educator who brings her soulfulness and thoughtfulness to all that she does. Super insightful, open, warm; she is the kind of guest artist who leaves something behind for everyone to think about and work on".

Discography

As leader
 Swing Low (Koch, 1999)
 Movin' On (Koch, 2002)
 Heaven Help Us All (Daly Bread, 2004)
 Baritone Monk (NCBC Music, 2012)
 2648 West Grand Boulevard (Glass Beach, 2016)
 Rah! Rah! (Ride Symbol, 2020)

As guest
 Joe Fonda, Loaded Basses (CIMP, 2006)
 Joel Forrester, In Heaven (Koch, 1997)
 George Garzone, Moodiology (NYC, 1999)
 Giacomo Gates, The Revolution Will Be Jazz (Savant, 2011)
 J. C. Hopkins, Underneath a Brooklyn Moon (Tigerlily, 2005)
 J. C. Hopkins, Meet Me at Minton's (Harlem Jazz, 2016)
 Taj Mahal, Like Never Before (Private Music, 1991)
 Tribecastan, New Deli (Evergreene Music, 2012)
 Warren Smith, Old News Borrowed (Blues Engine, 2009)

References

Bibliography

External links 
 Official site
 Allmusic biography

Living people
Jazz musicians from New York (state)
People from Westchester County, New York
Place of birth missing (living people)
Year of birth missing (living people)
20th-century American women musicians
20th-century American saxophonists
21st-century American women musicians
21st-century American saxophonists
American women composers
American jazz baritone saxophonists
American jazz composers
Women jazz composers
Women jazz saxophonists